Hornellsville can refer to:

 The town (township) of Hornellsville, New York
 Until 1906, the city of Hornell, New York was also named Hornellsville.